Sway Calloway is an American journalist, radio personality, executive producer and former rapper. Known as Sway, he is known for hosting music, news, and culture programming. He was the co-host of the nationally syndicated radio show The Wake Up Show as one half of the duo Sway & King Tech. Sway now hosts “Sway in the Morning” on SiriusXM Shade45 as well as the MTV show TRLAM.

Early career
As a teenager growing up in Oakland, California, Sway became a locally known rapper and b-boy performing on San Francisco's Pier 39. He teamed up with DJ King Tech after high school and the duo performed at various San Francisco Bay Area clubs. They also released independent albums. A major label record deal with Giant Records followed. The resulting album, Concrete Jungle in 1990, got them the job of co-hosting their own show on radio station KMEL.

Another album, Back 2 Basics was released in 2005 on Sway and Tech's own record label, Bolo Entertainment, which is distributed by Universal Music.

Radio 
The Wake Up Show featured music and interviews with well-known hip hop artists as well as up-and-coming ones. The show became very popular and began simulcasting to Los Angeles on KKBT in 1993 and to Chicago on WEJM by 1996. Ras Kass, Chino XL and Eminem are among the rappers who made their broadcasting debuts on the show. Soon, Sway was also hosting his own morning drive time show on the station.

The popularity of the show helped Sway and Tech get another record deal, this time with Interscope Records. Their album, This or That, reached #30 on Billboard's R&B/Hip-Hop Albums chart and #1 on the Top Heatseekers chart in 1999. The album featured contributions from hip hop artists such as RZA, Eminem, Xzibit, Kool G Rap, KRS-One, Big Daddy Kane, Tech N9ne, Pharoahe Monch and The Roots. Sway also made an appearance on Jennifer Lopez's DVD, The Reel Me in late 2003.

Sway hosts a weekday morning show on Eminem’s Shade 45 channel on SiriusXM! “Sway in the Morning” launched on Monday, July 18, 2011 on Shade 45 (SiriusXM channel 45) and airs Monday-Friday from 8am-12 noon ET.  The second week he was there Ludacris phoned in on the show and they talked about his music and movie career. In an interview with The Source in 2012, Sway talked about his experiences in both satellite and terrestrial radio.

In November 2013, Kanye West appeared as a guest on his show and had an infamous meltdown on air, uttering memorable lines like "You ain't got the answers Sway, You ain't been doing the education".

Television
In 2000, Sway was approached by MTV to join the network as a correspondent, becoming a regular reporter for its music video shows and news specials, including Total Request Live and the hip-hop music video show Direct Effect. Because MTV's studios are based in New York City, King Tech and The Wake Up Show went along with Sway in his move. Sway's prominence on MTV made the radio show even more popular than it was before. This inevitably led to a TV version of the show on MTV running briefly in January 2004. Sway and Tech also have a popular series of mixtapes that feature freestyles performed on the show. Sway recorded the voice introduction for the Super Bowl XXXVIII halftime show.

In September 2005, Sway decided not to renew his contract with MTV.  However, in 2006, Sway signed a new contract that included an ability to bring new projects to MTV, making him the first TV personality since Carson Daly to negotiate such a deal (Daly turned down a similar contract). He established the opportunity to produce programming with King Tech on MTV and other Viacom channels as well as continue to host programs.

Sway also appeared as a cameo in The Boondocks, voicing himself in "The Story Of Gangstalicious" in December 11, 2005.

He appeared as a guest star on the MTV sketch comedy show Short Circuitz in 2007.

Discography

Studio albums 

 Concrete Jungle (with King Tech) (1991)
 This or That (with King Tech) (1999)
 Back 2 Basics (with King Tech) (2005)

Filmography

References

External links

Television producers from California
American radio personalities
American television reporters and correspondents
VJs (media personalities)
American breakdancers
American street performers
Living people
African-American male rappers
American male rappers
Rappers from Oakland, California
West Coast hip hop musicians
21st-century American rappers
21st-century American male musicians
21st-century African-American musicians
20th-century African-American people
Year of birth missing (living people)